Alejandro Alberto Maldonado (born 7 March 1977) is an Argentine Paralympic athlete who competes in both middle-distance and long-distance wheelchair racing at international elite events. He is a seven-time Parapan American Games medalist and has competed at the 2004 and 2008 Summer Paralympics.

References

1977 births
Living people
Sportspeople from Mar del Plata
Paralympic athletes of Argentina
Athletes (track and field) at the 2004 Summer Paralympics
Athletes (track and field) at the 2008 Summer Paralympics
Medalists at the 2007 Parapan American Games
Medalists at the 2019 Parapan American Games
People with polio